The Slovakia men's national under-18 ice hockey team is the men's national under-18 ice hockey team of Slovakia. The team is controlled by the Slovak Ice Hockey Federation, a member of the International Ice Hockey Federation. The team represents Slovakia at the IIHF World U18 Championships. The team also competes in The Slovak 1. Liga, the second tier of Slovak hockey pyramid, as a preparation for the World U18 Championship.

International competitions

IIHF European U18 Championships

Lower divisions

Top division

IIHF World U18 Championships

Top division

Lower divisions

1.Liga
Since the 2013-14 season, Slovakia national under-18 ice hockey team competes in 1.Liga, the second tier of Slovak hockey pyramid, in order to prepare for the IIHF World U18 Championship. Throughout the season, the team plays 44 matches as all other teams, but without a possibility of relegation or promotion. The team plays under the name SR 18 and plays its home matches at a stadium in Trnava.

Source:

External links
 Team Slovakia all time scoring leaders in IIHF U18 World Championships
Slovakia at IIHF.com
 Official Website

References

under
National under-18 ice hockey teams